Miguel Ángel López Jaén (born 29 November 1982 in Elche, Spain) is a professional tennis player from Spain.

Junior career 
López Jaén had a brief career at the top level of Juniors play, reaching a high of No. 76 in April 2000 before turning his sights on pro tournaments.

Professional career

2000 to 2007 
López Jaén cracked the top-300 as a 20-year-old in 2003, but was sidelined by injury early in 2004. He regained his form in 2007, when he again cracked the top-300 late in the year.

2008 
From January through March, López Jaén met with limited success, failing to qualify in his ATP attempts, and having limited success at the Futures level.

However, in April, López Jaén qualified into his first ATP tournament, beating No. 161 Dušan Vemić in the qualifying round before bowing out to No. 27 Nicolás Almagro in the main draw in Valencia, Spain. After failing to qualify the next week in Barcelona, he beat his first top-100 opponent, No. 97 Peter Luczak, at a Challenger in Spain in May.

Later in May, López Jaén qualified for the 2008 French Open, beating No. 118 Brian Dabul and No. 242 Alex Bogdanovic to gain entry into his first Grand Slam main draw. He then won his first round match against No. 111 Frank Dancevic in four tight sets, losing to World No. 3 Novak Djokovic in the second round.

López Jaén last played in the 2015 Kazakhstan F4 Futures tournament, losing to George Tsivadze in the Round of 32.

López Jaén has earned a total of $208,271 in his ATP career.

Career finals

Singles

Runner-up (1)

Doubles (1)

Runners-up (3)

References

External links

 Lopez Jaen World Ranking History

1982 births
Living people
Sportspeople from Elche
Spanish male tennis players
Tennis players from the Valencian Community